The Eyring equation (occasionally also known as Eyring–Polanyi equation) is an equation used in chemical kinetics to describe changes in the rate of a chemical reaction against temperature. It was developed almost simultaneously in 1935 by Henry Eyring, Meredith Gwynne Evans and Michael Polanyi. The equation follows from the transition state theory, also known as activated-complex theory. If one assumes a constant enthalpy of activation and constant entropy of activation, the Eyring equation is similar to the empirical Arrhenius equation, despite the Arrhenius equation being empirical and the Eyring equation based on statistical mechanical justification.

General form
The general form of the Eyring–Polanyi equation somewhat resembles the Arrhenius equation:

The transmission coefficient  is often assumed to be equal to one as it reflects what fraction of the flux through the transition state proceeds to the product without recrossing the transition state. So, a transmission coefficient equal to one means that the fundamental no-recrossing assumption of transition state theory holds perfectly. However,  is typically not one because (i) the reaction coordinate chosen for the process at hand is usually not perfect and (ii) many barrier-crossing processes are somewhat or even strongly diffusive in nature. For example, the transmission coefficient of methane hopping in a gas hydrate from one site to an adjacent empty site is between 0.25 and 0.5. Typically, reactive flux correlation function (RFCF) simulations are performed in order to explicitly calculate  from the resulting plateau in the RFCF. This approach is also referred to as the Bennett-Chandler approach, which yields a dynamical correction to the standard transition state theory-based rate constant.

It can be rewritten as:

One can put this equation in the following form:

where:
 = reaction rate constant
 = absolute temperature
 = enthalpy of activation
 = gas constant
 = transmission coefficient
 = Boltzmann constant = R/NA, NA = Avogadro constant
 = Planck's constant
 = entropy of activation

If one assumes constant enthalpy of activation, constant entropy of activation, and constant transmission coefficient, this equation can be used as follows: A certain chemical reaction is performed at different temperatures and the reaction rate is determined. The plot of  versus  gives a straight line with slope  from which the enthalpy of activation can be derived and with intercept  from which the entropy of activation is derived.

Accuracy

Transition state theory requires a value of the transmission coefficient, called  in that theory. This value is often taken to be unity (i.e., the species passing through the transition state  always proceed directly to products  and never revert to reactants  and ).

Error propagation formulas

Notes

References

 

 

 
 

 

 Chapman, S. and Cowling, T.G. (1991). "The Mathematical Theory of Non-uniform Gases: An Account of the Kinetic Theory of Viscosity, Thermal Conduction and Diffusion in Gases" (3rd Edition). Cambridge University Press,

External links 
 Eyring equation at the University of Regensburg (archived from the original)
 Online-tool to calculate the reaction rate from an energy barrier (in kJ/mol) using the Eyring equation

Chemical kinetics
Reaction mechanisms
Equations
Physical chemistry

de:Eyring-Theorie